Lee Ah-reum (born 22 April 1992) is a South Korean taekwondo athlete. She attended Seoul Physical Education High School and Korea National Sport University. She won the gold medal at the 2014 Asian Games in the women's featherweight category, defeating Mayu Hamada of Japan. She won the gold medal at the 2017 World Taekwondo Championships in the women's featherweight category, beating the Olympic champion Jade Jones in the semi-finals and Hatice Kübra İlgün of Turkey in the final.
She has a history of participating in the Asian games.

References

External links 
  Video interview with Lee after the 2017 World Taekwondo Grand Prix in Moscow, via Mookas

1992 births
Living people
Asian Games gold medalists for South Korea
Asian Games silver medalists for South Korea
Korea National Sport University alumni
Medalists at the 2014 Asian Games
Medalists at the 2018 Asian Games
South Korean female taekwondo practitioners
Taekwondo practitioners at the 2014 Asian Games
Universiade medalists in taekwondo
Asian Games medalists in taekwondo
Taekwondo practitioners at the 2018 Asian Games
Universiade silver medalists for South Korea
World Taekwondo Championships medalists
Asian Taekwondo Championships medalists
Medalists at the 2017 Summer Universiade
Taekwondo practitioners at the 2020 Summer Olympics
People from Yeoju
Sportspeople from Gyeonggi Province
Olympic taekwondo practitioners of South Korea
21st-century South Korean women